This article provides a list of Dominican Summer League champions. The Dominican Summer League (DSL) is a professional baseball sports league operating in the Dominican Republic. Teams within the DSL are affiliates of Major League Baseball teams.

League champions
The league normally holds a postseason championship series between its top two teams. The format of the series has varied, with single-game, best-of-three, and best-of-five formats used at different times. In 1990 and 1991, a round-robin tournament was contested between three teams. In 2021, there was no postseason. As of 2022, eight teams—six division winners and two wild card teams—qualify for the playoffs seeded by winning percentage regardless of division standing. All postseason series are in best-of-three format.

 In 1990 and 1991, the finals were structured as a three-team round-robin tournament.

 In 2021, there was no postseason; DSL Blue Jays had the league's best winning percentage (38–19; .667), followed by DSL Colorado (39–20; .661).

Championship wins by team
Championships by split-squad teams (e.g. DSL Yankees 1) are listed by their main team (e.g. DSL Yankees).

Notes
 The Piratas del Atlantico of 1985 were a co-op team of the Atlanta Braves, Los Angeles Dodgers, and Oakland Athletics.
 The 1986 winners were a co-op team of Chicago, the Houston Astros, Los Angeles Dodgers, and Oakland Athletics; unclear if "Chicago" was White Sox or Cubs.
 The 1986 runners-up were a co-op team of the Atlanta Braves, Baltimore Orioles, Philadelphia Phillies, and Toronto Blue Jays.
 The Indios del Valle of 1987 were a co-op team of the Baltimore Orioles, Philadelphia Phillies, and Pittsburgh Pirates.
 The Piratas del Atlantico of 1987 were a co-op team of the Atlanta Braves, Los Angeles Dodgers, and Oakland Athletics.

References

C
Dominican Summer
Dominican Summer League champions
Dominican Summer League